John Augustus Bernard Koch (1845-1928) was a Melbourne (Victoria, Australia) architect who practiced between 1869 and 1913. He also became mayor of Richmond near Melbourne.

Life and career
Koch was born in Hamburg in August 1845 and migrated to Australia with his family in 1855. He was educated and trained as an architect in Melbourne and served his articles with F. M. White. He became White's assistant until 1873 when he started his own practice. In 1871 he married Anna Puttmann at the German Lutheran Trinity Church at Eastern Hill (East Melbourne) where they were active members of the congregation. They had a family of six sons and three daughters. In 1873 he was appointed as Architect to the City of Melbourne and designed a number of market buildings. In 1887 he was appointed Architect for the City of Richmond. He took an active interest in professional and community affairs. He was active in the R.V.I.A., served as a Councillor in the City of Richmond for eight years and served as Mayor from 1882 to 1883.

Koch ceased practice in 1913 and his fifth son, Bernard, carried on his practice. He died in Hawthorn, Victoria in August 1928. He is buried in Boroondara Cemetery.

His best known buildings are the National Trust owned Labassa (originally called Ontario) (1889-1890) in Manor Grove, Caulfield North and the privately owned Friesia (1887) at 23 Isabella Grove, Hawthorn.  Most of his work was in Hawthorn and Richmond.

Notable buildings
Castlemaine Hospital  1869   (demolished)
Castlemaine Hospital Nurses’ Home, 2 Edward St, Castlemaine  c.1870   
Hay Market, Horse, Cow and Pig markets and Corn Exchange, Cnr. Flemington Rd and Elizabeth St, Melbourne  1873 (demolished)
House, Residence for J.A.B. Koch, 38 Stanley St, Richmond 1873
E.S.& A. Bank, Cnr. Church and Swan Streets, Richmond 1874 (demolished)
Richmond Temperance Hall, 316 Church St, Richmond  1874
South Richmond Free Library, 417 Church St, Richmond  1880 (demolished)
23, 25, 27 Shakespeare Gve, Hawthorn  1884
"Herald" Office, 30 Swanston St, Melbourne (demolished...now City Square)
Deutscher Verein (German Association) Club Rooms, 7 Alfred Place, Melbourne 1885 (recently Stokehouse Restaurant)
"The Spread Eagle Hotel", Corner of Bridge Rd & Coppin St, Richmond   1885
Residence and Surgery for Dr. Druidin, 384 Church St, Richmond 1885
"Friesia", Residence for the German Consul, 23 Isabella Grove, Hawthorn   1887
Record Chambers, 479-481 Collins St, Melbourne   1887 (now part of Olderfleet Buildings redevelopment)
Richmond UFS Free Dispensary, 292 Church St, Richmond   1887
"Borussia", German Consulate, 6 Shakespeare Gve, Hawthorn   1888
45 Chrystobel Cres, Hawthorn 1888
"Narellan", 3 Moule St, Brighton  1889
"Howlands" or "Alexander's House", 37 Docker St, Richmond 1889
"Ulimaroa", 630 St Kilda Rd, South Melbourne 1889 (now the home of the Australian and New Zealand College of Anaesthetists)
"Ontario" (now Labassa), Residence for A.W. Robertson, Manor Gve, Caulfield North  1889-1890
"Helenville", Residence for J.A.B. Koch, 377 Church St, Richmond   1889
"Ancient Order of Foresters" Swan St, Richmond (demolished?)  
Parsonage, Lutheran Church, 22a Parliament Place, East Melbourne, 1890
"Minerva" (later "Tandarra"), Residence for J. C. Stanford, 68 (now 58) Vale St, East Melbourne   1891
Trinity Lutheran Church and Manse, 51-53 Victoria St, Doncaster   1892
Richmond Fire Station, 131 Lord St, Richmond   1893
Bowen Memorial Operating Theatre, Melbourne Hospital 1896
Maffra Beet Sugar Co. Factory, Maffra   1897  (demolished 1960)
Warehouse for  Messrs. L. Stevenson & Son Ltd, Flinders Lane, Melbourne 1898  (Unbuilt competition winner)
"Mount Gambier", Villa residence for  Mr. Rudolf Boehnke,(Brewer), 32 Barkers Rd (Cnr. Findon Ave) Hawthorn  1898
"Fallon’s Prince Alfred Hotel", 619 Church St, Richmond   1899
Nurses Quarters, Women's Hospital, Melbourne  1900
German Arch, Collins St, Melbourne (To celebrate the opening of the Australian Parliament. Decorated by Peter Hansen.), May 1901 
"Rosscommon", Villa residence for F.W. Fallon (Publican), 55 Kinkora Rd, Hawthorn 1901
"Urbrae" 171 Hoddle St, Richmond  c. 1901
"Tantallon", 79 Oxley Rd, Hawthorn (1894). Formerly 77 Oxley Rd. Villa built for Mrs Annie Cameron.
5-9 Yarra St, Hawthorn attrib.  (undated)
48 Power St, Hawthorn (undated) (Koch family residence 1896-1899)
"St. James", 23 Isabella Gve, Hawthorn (Koch family residence)
361 Highett St, Richmond attrib.  (undated)

References 

 Forge,W., 'Koch, John Augustus Bernard (1845–1928)', Australian Dictionary of Biography, National Centre of Biography, Australian National University, http://adb.anu.edu.au/biography/koch-john-augustus-bernard-6995/text12159, accessed 25 January 2013.
 Lewis, Miles, 'Koch, John A(ugustus) B(ernard)'. Grove Art Online http://www.oxfordartonline.com:80/subscriber/article/grove/art/T047093
 Mees, Herbert D (ed.) 'A German Church in the Garden of God: Melbourne's  Trinity Lutheran Church 1853 - 2003'. East Melb.: Historical Society for Trinity German Lutheran Church, 2004.
 Smith, Ian & Llewellyn, Peter, 'John A. B. Koch' (Undergraduate thesis) University of Melbourne. Faculty of Architecture, Building and Planning, 1969.

1845 births
1928 deaths
Victorian (Australia) architects
Australian Lutherans
German emigrants to Australia
Architects from Hamburg
19th-century Australian architects
20th-century Australian architects
Architects from Melbourne
Burials in Victoria (Australia)